Sirius Academy North (formerly Thomas Ferens Academy) is a mixed secondary school located in the North Hull Estate of Kingston upon Hull in the East Riding of Yorkshire, England. The school was originally named after Thomas Ferens, the Liberal Member of Parliament for Hull East from 1906 to 1918.

The school was established in 2012 as part of the Building Schools for the Future programme. The school largely replaced Sir Henry Cooper School which closed the same year. As an academy, the school was sponsored by the University of Hull, Hull City Council, Wilberforce College and Wyke College.

In July 2015, after almost a year in special measures, it was announced that Thomas Ferens Academy was to become Sirius Academy North and be part of the Sirius Academy Multi Academy Trust (SAMAT), therefore being a "sister" school of the former Sirius Academy - now Sirius Academy West - which was rated outstanding by Ofsted.

References

External links
Sirius Academy North official website

Secondary schools in Kingston upon Hull
Educational institutions established in 2012
2012 establishments in England
Academies in Kingston upon Hull